Camp Bling was a UK-based road protest camp set up in Southend-on-Sea, Essex during September 2005 to obstruct a £25 million plan to widen the Priory Crescent section of the A1159 road over the Royal Saxon tomb in Prittlewell. In April 2009 the authority announced that plans to build the road had been abandoned and the camp was disbanded in July 2009.

History

In 2004 Southend-on-Sea Borough Council proposed the 'Priory Crescent road widening scheme' and a public inquiry was held. The council proceeded with the scheme, estimated at £25 million, explaining that it was important to Southend and that a democratic decision had been taken after considering opposing views. During early excavations, an Anglo-Saxon king's burial chamber was discovered which was described by British archaeologists as "the most spectacular discovery of its kind made during the past 60 years".

Of those responding to the official Winter 2001 Civic News survey, only 16 people were in favour of the proposals from a delivery area covering all Southend households.

On 23 April 2009 at a meeting with the council the authority told the protesters that the road widening scheme had been abandoned, and the protesters agreed to leave within 3 months.

The camp
The camp was situated between a main road and a railway line. The site consisted of a large communal area, a visitors centre and several personal dwellings. All buildings were made from re-cycled materials. The communal area featured seating, heating and a bookcase. The buildings were heated by wood burning fires and run off donated wood. Water was collected on a daily basis. Food was cooked on a calor gas oven and there was a composting toilet. A wind generator provided some of the evening lighting.

See also
Royal saxon tomb in Prittlewell

References

External links 
Freedom of information request
Road fighting is not dead! In England anyway

Anti-road protest
Transport in Southend-on-Sea
Buildings and structures in Essex